Geist is the fourth studio album by American metalcore band The Browning. It was released on October 26, 2018 through Spinefarm Records and was produced by Jonny McBee.

Background and promotion
On August 17, 2018, The Browning released the first single "Carnage" featuring Jake Hill. At the same time, they announced the album itself, the album cover, the track list, and release date. On September 21, the band unveiled the second single "Final Breath" and its corresponding music video. On October 19, one week before the album release, the band published the third and final single "Geist" featuring Paul Bartzsch of We Butter the Bread with Butter.

Critical reception

Geist received generally positive reviews from critics. New Noise gave the album 5 out of 5 and stated: "Sometimes it feels like bands attempting something along these general lines are afraid to go 'over the edge' and see their artistic ambition to fruition, not The Browning on Geist, though. Their music proves both dynamic and cutting. There's a dark, dour sense overlying the work because of the interplay that's a welcome addition. The back and forth and weave crafts a feeling of unease that wouldn't be there to contribute to the final picture of the band's presentation if they'd played it 'safe.' There's a mature finality and polish to their presentation."

Wall of Sound gave the album a score 3/5 and saying: "Geist is a surprisingly good album. It'll serve a niche purpose in my own personal life, but I can confidently state there are song great songs present here. The Browning know how to deliver bone shaking music that feels at home in a mosh pit or a Berlin dance club."

Track listing

Personnel
Credits adapted from Discogs.

The Browning
 Jonny McBee  – lead vocals, programming, electronics, production, mixing
 Brian Moore  – guitars
 Collin Woroniak  – bass, backing vocals
 Cody Stewart  – drums, engineering, mixing, mastering

Additional musicians
 Jake Hill  – guest vocals on track 8
 Paul Bartzsch of We Butter the Bread with Butter  – guest vocals on track 9

Additional personnel
 Cliff Wiener and Steve Davis  – management
 Daniel DeFonce and Vadim Khomich  – booking
 Darren Dalessio  – A&R
 Kensuke Creations  – artwork
 Brandon Day  – design, layout

References 

2018 albums
Spinefarm Records albums
The Browning albums